HMCS Scotian is a Royal Canadian Navy Reserve Division (NRD) located in Halifax, Nova Scotia. Dubbed a stone frigate, HMCS Scotian is a land-based naval establishment for part-time sailors as well as a local recruitment centre for the Canadian Naval Reserve.

References

Royal Canadian Naval Reserve
Military units and formations of Canada in World War II